Citizens' Initiative may refer to:

Initiative, a means by which the public can force a referendum
, a formal citizens' petition in Germany
Popular initiative (Switzerland), a type of referendum in Switzerland
Citizens' Initiative (Andorra), a political party in Andorra
Citizen's Initiative of Gora, a political party in Kosovo
Civic Initiative Serbia, a political party in Kosovo
European Citizens' Initiative, by which EU citizens can call directly on the European Commission